The 2011 Irish general election took place on Friday 25 February to elect 166 Teachtaí Dála across 43 constituencies to Dáil Éireann, the lower house of Ireland's parliament, the Oireachtas. The Dáil was dissolved and the general election called by President Mary McAleese on 1 February, at the request of Taoiseach Brian Cowen. The 31st Dáil met on 9 March 2011 to nominate a Taoiseach and ratify the new ministers of the 29th Government of Ireland.

Cowen had previously announced on 20 January that the election would be held on 11 March, and that after the 2011 budget had been passed he would seek a dissolution of the 30th Dáil by the President. However, the Green Party, the junior party in coalition government with Cowen's Fianna Fáil, withdrew from government on 23 January, stating that it would support only a truncated finance bill from the opposition benches, in order to force an earlier election. On 24 January, Finance Minister Brian Lenihan Jnr reached an agreement with the opposition in Dáil Éireann to complete all stages of passing the finance bill in both houses of the Oireachtas by 29 January—following which the Dáil was to be dissolved immediately. Constitutionally, following a Dáil dissolution, an election must be held within 30 days.

Following the collapse of the coalition, the then minority governing party, Fianna Fáil, sought to minimise its losses following historically low poll ratings in the wake of the Irish financial crisis. Fine Gael sought to gain a dominant position in Irish politics after poor results in the 2000s, and to replace Fianna Fáil for the first time as the largest party in Dáil Éireann. The Labour Party hoped to make gains from both sides, and was widely expected to become the second-largest party and to enter into coalition government with Fine Gael; its highest ambition at the start of the campaign, buoyed by record poll ratings in preceding months, was to become the leading partner in government for the first time in the party's 99-year history. The Green Party, having been in coalition with Fianna Fáil during the Government of the 30th Dáil, faced stiff competition for its votes and was expected to lose at least four of its six seats. Sinn Féin was expected to make gains, encouraged by a by-election victory in November 2010 and by opinion polls which placed it ahead of Fianna Fáil. Some other left-wing groups, including People Before Profit, Workers and Unemployed Action and the Socialist Party, contested the general election under a joint banner, the United Left Alliance.

Fianna Fáil was swept from power in the worst defeat of a sitting government since the formation of the Irish state in 1922. The party lost more than half of its first-preference vote from 2007, and garnered only 20 seats. It was the third-largest party in the 31st Dáil; this was the first election since that of September 1927 out of which it did not emerge the largest party in the chamber. The Irish Times, Ireland's newspaper of record, described Fianna Fáil's meltdown as "defeat on a historic scale." Fine Gael won 76 seats, becoming the largest party in the Dáil for the first time in its 78-year history, while the Labour Party became the second-largest party, with 37 seats; Sinn Féin also increased its number of seats. Fine Gael leader Enda Kenny became Taoiseach, in a coalition with Labour.

Background
Following the bailout of Irish banks and the deteriorating level of state debt that led to the Irish financial crisis, the Irish government agreed to a bailout from the European Union and the International Monetary Fund amid fears of a wider Eurozone crisis. The European Financial Stability Facility then offered the government a multibillion-euro deal for its new debt burden.

The notion of such a move was widely condemned in Ireland, with The Irish Times criticising Fianna Fáil that despite its "primary aims [to] the commitment 'to maintain the status of Ireland as a sovereign State'... The Republican Party's ideals are in tatters now."

Following the acceptance of the deal on 21 November 2010, the Green Party leader John Gormley called for the Taoiseach to fix a date for a general election in the second half of January 2011; however, he added that the party would support the coalition for the "coming weeks and months". The Labour Party and Fine Gael called for an immediate election in order to seek "political certainty." On 22 November 2010, Taoiseach Brian Cowen indicated that the election would take place in early 2011 after the 2011 budgetary process (a prerequisite to the bailout) had been completed. There were fears that calling the election could trigger another credit downgrade.

On 16 January Cowen announced his decision to stay on as Taoiseach and to lead Fianna Fáil into the general election. On 18 January he called for and won a vote of confidence within the party (which had been precipitated by revelations of two previously undisclosed meetings with Anglo Irish Bank chairman Seán FitzPatrick) with a majority of the 71 Fianna Fáil deputies supporting him. Despite saying he would offer Cowen "full support", Foreign Minister Micheál Martin resigned. However, following criticism within his party after his failed attempt to carry out a reshuffle of Fianna Fáil ministers, Cowen announced his resignation as leader of the party on 22 January. He confirmed he would remain as Taoiseach until after the election.

The key dates were:

Electoral system
Ireland uses proportional representation with a single transferable vote, also known as PR–STV. The general election took place in 43 parliamentary constituencies throughout the state for 165 of the 166 seats in the Dáil, with the final seat taken by the outgoing Ceann Comhairle (chairman), returned automatically. Each multi-member constituency returns three, four or five Teachtaí Dála (Dáil deputies).

The closing date for nominations was 9 February 2011. A total of 566 candidates contested the election, nearly 100 more than the 2007 general election. The number of candidates per party was: Fine Gael (104), Fianna Fáil (75), Labour Party (68), Green Party (43), Sinn Féin (41), and Independents and smaller parties (233). The latter figure includes 20 candidates affiliated to the United Left Alliance, 20 independents who ran under the New Vision label, eight Christian Solidarity Party candidates, six Workers' Party and five Fís Nua candidates. Voting took place between 07:00 and 22:00 (WET).

Date

Section 7 of the Electoral (Amendment) Act 1927 requires that the Dáil be dissolved within five years after its first meeting following the previous election (14 June 2007). Article 16.3.2 of the Constitution of Ireland requires that a general election for members of Dáil Éireann must take place not later than thirty days after the dissolution. The next general election had to, therefore, take place no later than 14 July 2012.

The current statutory framework for the setting of a date for polling day in the general election was set out in the Electoral Act 1992, as amended. Section 96 of the Electoral Act 1992 requires that the poll is held, not earlier than the seventeenth day or later than the twenty-fifth day, following the day on which the Dáil is formally dissolved by the President. The writs for the election are issued by the Clerk of the Dáil on the day the Dáil is dissolved.

Minister for Tourism, Culture and Sport Mary Hanafin said the general election was likely to take place in mid-March 2011. Batt O'Keeffe, the then Minister for Enterprise, Trade and Innovation, hinted that the election might take place on 25 March. On 19 January the Green Party indicated that they expected the budgetary process to be completed by the end of February, and that the election should be held no later than the end of March. Brian Cowen attempted a reshuffle of his party's ministers on 20 January 2011. However, following the resignation of six cabinet ministers, it became clear that the Green Party would not allow him to fill the vacancies. He subsequently announced that the election for the 31st Dáil would take place on 11 March. Motions of no confidence in the outgoing government were tabled by Fine Gael for 25 January and by the Labour Party for 26 January; both parties said they would be willing to give the government time to expedite the Finance Act in return for bringing forward the election date. Finance Minister Brian Lenihan said it could be moved by "a week or two at most". Cowen resigned as Fianna Fáil leader on 22 January, and the Green Party withdrew from government the next day, but promised to support the Finance Act.

On 28 January it was announced that Cowen intended to ask McAleese to dissolve the Dáil on 1 February. Cowen formally asked for a Dáil dissolution on 1 February, after the finance bill cleared parliament. In accordance with Irish constitutional practice (no Irish president has ever refused such a request), McAleese granted the dissolution.

As usual, certain offshore islands voted earlier than the rest of the country. Voters on Arranmore, Clare Island, Gola, Inishbiggle, Inishbofin (Donegal), Inishfree, Inishturk and Tory Island headed to the polls on 23 February; voters on the Aran Islands and Inishbofin (Galway) cast their ballots on 24 February.

Constituency changes

The number of TDs elected and the number of constituencies contested remained the same as for the previous general election, though there were substantial boundary changes.

Limerick East (5) replaced by Limerick City (4)
Limerick West (3) replaced by Limerick (3)
Kerry North (3) replaced by Kerry North–West Limerick (3)
Dublin West (from 3 to 4)
Dún Laoghaire (from 5 to 4)
Louth (from 4 to 5)
Number of seats given in brackets after constituency name.
Boundary changes were also made in twenty other constituencies.

Retiring incumbents
The following 39 members of the 30th Dáil did not contest the 2011 general election.

†Vacant seat, deputy had resigned before the dissolution of Dáil Éireann.

In four constituencies (Cavan–Monaghan, Cork North-West, Dublin North-West, and Dublin South-Central) Fianna Fáil nominated fewer candidates than it had outgoing TDs, effectively conceding a seat in each.

Campaign
Sinn Féin leader Gerry Adams (an MP and MLA for Belfast West) announced on 15 November 2010 that he would resign both these seats and contest the Louth constituency at the following Irish general election, in an attempt to retain the seat being vacated by the retirement of Arthur Morgan.

A number of election candidates were given formal warnings not to place election posters until the date had been announced.

Fianna Fáil leader Micheál Martin stated that the party would not rule out supporting a minority Fine Gael government if its policies were in line with Fianna Fáil's programme for economic recovery. On 31 January 2011 Martin named Mary Hanafin as the new deputy leader, while the government chief whip John Curran was named as justice spokesman. Barry Andrews was appointed as health spokesman, Billy Kelleher transport, Peter Power foreign affairs and trade, and Niall Collins defence. He also appointed Willie O'Dea, a former Minister of Defence who had resigned in February 2010 after committing perjury in front of the High Court, as communications spokesperson. Brian Lenihan would continue as the finance spokesman in addition to being Finance Minister.

In early February, European Central Bank President Jean-Claude Trichet told political parties to go ahead with the terms of the EU-IMF financial bailout plan. This came despite Fine Gael and Labour saying they would like to see a renegotiation of some of the key elements of the deal. Labour Party leader Eamon Gilmore asked voters to choose between "Frankfurt's Way or Labour's Way".

Micheál Martin was involved in an alleged racist gaffe, mocking a Chinese accent while speaking on his party's innovation proposals at the Dublin Web Summit.

During the campaign, there were numerous reports of infighting between Fianna Fáil candidates Peter Power and Willie O'Dea in Limerick City, Cyprian Brady and Mary Fitzpatrick in Dublin Central, and Mary Hanafin and Barry Andrews in Dún Laoghaire.

New parties and groupings
A number of parties and political alliances were set up in order to contest the election.

The United Left Alliance was set up on 25 November 2010, announcing it would field twenty candidates in the election. The group consisted of People Before Profit, the Socialist Party and the Tipperary South-based Workers and Unemployed Action. However, the group failed to get its name mentioned on the ballot.

 A number of public figures, including journalists Fintan O'Toole, David McWilliams and Eamon Dunphy, discussed standing as members of a loose alliance dubbed "Democracy Now" to reform the political system and replace the IMF bailout agreement with a structured debt default. O'Toole wrote on 29 January that, once the election date was brought forward from late March, "the risk of going off half-cocked seemed to outweigh the hope of making a difference", and the plan was abandoned. The Evening Herald reported that "almost half of the 20 figures approached by Democracy Now in [late January] were unable to commit to the campaign". Finian McGrath, Catherine Murphy, and Shane Ross, who stood as independents, were also involved in the proposal.

The newly registered party Fís Nua announced on 5 February that it was running six candidates in the election, three of whom were former Green Party members.

Television debates
Micheál Martin proposed that a series of debates between Fianna Fáil, Fine Gael and the Labour Party should take place on RTÉ, TV3 and a debate in Irish on TG4. This proposal was accepted by the Labour Party leader Eamon Gilmore. On 27 January, Fine Gael leader Enda Kenny proposed a five-way debate which was also to include Sinn Féin and the Green Party. Kenny refused to take part in any debate that would involve TV3 news broadcaster Vincent Browne. In September 2010, Browne had made a comment on his show that Kenny "should go into a dark room with a gun and bottle of whiskey". Browne has since apologised for the remark, and said he would step aside as moderator of the TV3 three-way leaders' debate if Kenny agreed to take part. Responding to TV3's offer to replace Browne as moderator, Kenny stated that a clash in his schedule meant he was unable to take part in the debate.

In negotiations, TV3 proposed following the British model, in which the moderator does not ask follow-up questions and does not criticise or comment on the leaders' answers. However, the right of journalist Vincent Browne to "seek factual clarification where necessary" was reserved. It was agreed Browne would sit between Micheál Martin and Eamon Gilmore, and their positions either to the right or left of him were determined by the drawing of lots. Although both Martin and Gilmore had requested that an empty chair be left to represent the absence of Kenny, this was ruled out by TV3.

A second debate lasting an hour took place on RTÉ on 14 February. The debate was hosted by Pat Kenny and involved leaders of the five main parties; Micheál Martin, Enda Kenny, Eamon Gilmore, John Gormley and Gerry Adams. The studio audience consisted of 140 undecided voters, six of whom asked pre-set questions. Leaders were given 45 seconds to respond to the question with efforts made to confine contributions to 45 seconds during the "free debate".

The third debate took place on TG4 in Irish, the first debate to take place in the Irish language. The fourth and final debate took place on RTÉ on 22 February. The final debate was watched by an average television audience of 800,000 people.

Directors of Elections
The following people were appointed by their parties to act as their director of elections:
Fianna Fáil – Tony Killeen
Fine Gael – Phil Hogan
Labour Party – Ruairi Quinn
Green Party – Donal Geoghegan
Sinn Féin – Brian Tumilty

Opinion polls

The parties maintained their results from the 2007 general election for about eighteen months afterwards, with little change in polling figures. Fianna Fáil enjoyed a small bounce in May 2008 after the election of Brian Cowen to succeed Bertie Ahern as Taoiseach.

Fine Gael took the lead in opinion polls after the October 2008 budget, which included tax increases and spending cuts to address the growing financial crisis. A second emergency budget in April 2009 continued the downward trend in the popularity of the government parties, with Labour now capturing the gains from disaffected Fianna Fáil supporters. Two polls in the first half of 2009 showed Fianna Fáil coming third, behind both Fine Gael and Labour. Most polls between the 2009 local elections and the summer of 2010 showed Fine Gael far ahead in first place, around the mid-30s, with Fianna Fáil in the mid-20s and Labour in the low 20s.

An Irish Times poll on 11 June 2010 gave Labour an unprecedented 32%, ahead of Fine Gael on 28% and Fianna Fáil on 17%. This surprise result was followed by the unsuccessful leadership challenge by Fine Gael deputy leader Richard Bruton against Enda Kenny; a period of instability followed, during which Labour challenged Fine Gael for first place in the polls.

As the economic crisis continued to worsen in late 2010, Fianna Fáil fell below 20% support, and did not recover from this in any opinion polls taken before the election. In November 2010, the EU/IMF rescue, followed by an historic defeat at the Donegal South-West by-election, marked a new period in opinion polling. Fianna Fáil and the Green Party fell to unprecedented lows, with improvements for Sinn Féin, Fine Gael and independent candidates, and a decline in Labour's position. Fine Gael took a strong lead in polling, with Labour safely in second place, while Fianna Fáil struggled to maintain third place, just ahead of Sinn Féin and independents, all polling in the low teens.

As the election campaign began in February, Fine Gael enjoyed a surge at the expense of the other parties. Results in the high 30s suggested that Fine Gael could form a government on its own, rather than with its traditional coalition partners in the Labour Party. However, the exit poll taken on election night, and the subsequent results on the following days, showed an eleventh-hour fall in Fine Gael support to the mid-30s, the benefits of which seemed to accrue to Fianna Fáil and Independents.

Polling for parliamentary represented parties is as such:

Results

! style="background-color:#E9E9E9; text-align:center;" colspan="13"|31st Irish general election – 25 February 2011
|-
! style="background-color:white;" colspan=13| 
|- style="text-align:left;"
! style="background-color:#E9E9E9; text-align:center;" colspan=2 | Party
! style="background-color:#E9E9E9; text-align:center;" | Leader
! style="background-color:#E9E9E9; text-align:center;" | FirstPref votes
! style="background-color:#E9E9E9; text-align:center;" | % FPv
! style="background-color:#E9E9E9; text-align:center;" | Swing%
! style="background-color:#E9E9E9; text-align:center;" | TDs
! style="background-color:#E9E9E9; text-align:center;" | Change(since 2007)
! style="background-color:#E9E9E9; text-align:center;" | % of seats
|-
| 
| style="text-align:left;" |
| 801,628
| 36.1
| 8.8
| 76
| 25
| 45.8
|-
| 
| style="text-align:left;" |
| 431,796
| 19.5
| 9.3
| 37
| 17
| 22.3
|-
| 
| style="text-align:left;" |
| 387,358
| 17.5
| 24.2
| 20
| 57
| 12.0
|-
| 
| style="text-align:left;" |
| 220,661
| 9.9
| 3.0
| 14
| 10
| 8.4
|-
| 
| style="text-align:left;" |None
| 26,770
| 1.2
| 0.6
| 2
| 2
| 1.2
|-
| 
| style="text-align:left;" |None
| 21,551
| 1.0
| 0.6
| 2
| 2
| 1.2
|-
| 
| style="text-align:left;" |
| 8,818
| 0.4
| 0.1
| 1
| 1
| 0.6
|-
| 
| style="text-align:left;" |
| 41,039
| 1.8
| 2.9
| 0
| 6
| 0
|-
| 
| style="text-align:left;" |
| 4,939
| 0.2
| 0.2
| 0
|
| 0
|-
| 
| style="text-align:left;" |
| 3,056
| 0.1
|  0
| 0
|
| 0
|-
| 
| style="text-align:left;" |
| 2,102
| 0.1
|  0
| 0
|
| 0
|-
| 
| style="text-align:left;" |None
| 938
| 0
|
| 0
|
| 0
|-
| 
| style="text-align:left;" |—
| 269,703
| 12.1
| 6.9
| 14
| 9
| 8.4
|- class="unsortable"
! colspan=3 style="background-color:#E9E9E9" | Total
! style="background-color:#E9E9E9" | 2,220,359
! style="background-color:#E9E9E9" | 100
! style="background-color:#E9E9E9" | 
! style="background-color:#E9E9E9" | 166
! style="background-color:#E9E9E9" | Turnout
! style="background-color:#E9E9E9" | 70.0%

The United Left Alliance (ULA) won 59,423 votes (2.7%) and five seats. The ULA comprised the Socialist Party, the People Before Profit Alliance, the Workers and Unemployed Action and independent candidate Declan Bree (2,284 votes).

Independents include New Vision candidates (25,422 votes) and People's Convention candidates (1,512 votes).
Fine Gael and Labour Party majority coalition government formed.

Voting summary

Seats summary

Fianna Fáil
Fianna Fáil suffered the worst defeat of a sitting government in the history of the Irish state, and amongst the worst ever suffered by any Western European governing party. The party's first-preference vote plunged to 17.5 per cent – less than half of its first-preference vote from 2007. Without a significant number of transfers, the election count quickly turned into a rout.

From 77 seats at dissolution, the party was reduced to a rump of 20 TDs, the worst election result in the party's 85-year history. The 57-seat loss far exceeded Fine Gael's 15-seat loss in 1977, the previous record for the worst defeat of a sitting government. By comparison, after the five elections since 1932 at which Fianna Fáil was consigned to opposition, it remained the largest party in the Dáil, with well over 60 TDs.

The party suffered a near-total meltdown in Dublin, which had been one of the party's strongholds since 1977. Twelve of the party's 13 Dublin TDs seeking re-election were defeated. Outgoing Finance Minister Brian Lenihan Jnr barely retained his Dublin West seat on the fifth count, and was, until his death on 10 June 2011, the lone Fianna Fáil TD from the capital. Notably, the party was completely shut out in Dublin Central, which former Taoiseach Bertie Ahern had represented for 34 years.

The most high-profile casualty was Tánaiste and Minister for Education and Skills Mary Coughlan, who lost the seat she had held in Donegal South-West since 1987. The Guardian newspaper described it as "Ireland's Portillo moment". She was the second Tánaiste in a row to lose their own seat in an election, after Michael McDowell in 2007. Other senior cabinet ministers who lost their seats included Pat Carey and Mary Hanafin. Junior ministers who lost their seats included Barry Andrews, Áine Brady, Seán Connick, John Curran, Seán Haughey, Conor Lenihan, Martin Mansergh, Peter Power and Dick Roche. Fianna Fáil also had no women TDs in the 31st Dáil.

The severity of the defeat came as a shock to many of Fianna Fáil's senior leaders. Martin and others had concluded almost as soon as the election writ was drawn up that the party would not win a record fifth consecutive term in government. However, while they anticipated massive losses, they had hoped to hold on to at least 30 seats.

Fine Gael
Fine Gael became largest party in the Dáil for the first time in its 78-year history.  The party won 76 seats, six more than its previous record seat count in 1982. There initially had been talk of Fine Gael winning an overall majority—something no Irish party has done since 1977—but the party ultimately came up seven seats short. The party also took 17 seats in the Dublin region-its best result in 29 years-to become the second party in the capital.

Labour Party
The Labour Party made a very strong showing, almost doubling its share of the vote to become the second-largest party in the Dáil, its best showing ever. It also took 18 seats in Dublin to become the first party in the capital. However, in contrast to predictions by Eamon Gilmore, most of the party's gains were in the Greater Dublin, Munster and Leinster constituencies. Despite an increase in its vote, the party only managed to win two seats in Connacht, both of which were in County Galway.

Sinn Féin
Sinn Féin also made significant gains. All its sitting TDs were returned, Seán Crowe regaining the seat in Dublin South-West he lost in 2007, and party president Gerry Adams retaining Arthur Morgan's seat in Louth, topping the poll. In addition to winning targeted seats such as Dublin Central, Dublin North-West and Meath West the party gained unexpected seats in Cork East and Sligo–North Leitrim. It won 14 seats, the best performance for the party's current incarnation.

Green Party
The Green Party lost all of the six seats it had previously held, including that of party leader John Gormley and Eamon Ryan, both of whom served as cabinet ministers in the previous government. Three out of their six incumbent TDs lost their deposits. The party's share of the vote fell below 2%, meaning that they could not reclaim election expenses, and their lack of parliamentary representation led to the ending of state funding for the party. This financial crisis made it likely that the Greens may have been forced to close their Dublin office and make "some if not all" of their staff redundant.

United Left Alliance
The United Left Alliance won five seats. Two former TDs returned to the Dáil: Joe Higgins of the Socialist Party and Séamus Healy of the Workers and Unemployed Action. Clare Daly became the Socialist Party's second-ever TD. The People Before Profit won its first two seats in Dáil Éireann, with Richard Boyd Barrett and Joan Collins elected. United Left Alliance candidates won a combined vote share of 2.7%, more than the Green Party.

Notable firsts
The 2011 election resulted in a record number of first time TDs, with 76 elected for the first time.

It was the first occasion in which no political party won a seat in every constituency. Fine Gael took a seat in every constituency with the exception of Dublin North-West.

Labour Party TDs Dominic Hannigan and John Lyons became the first openly gay people to be elected to the Dáil.

TDs who lost their seats
Forty-five sitting TDs (27% of the total) lost their Dáil seats: Fianna Fáil (35), Green Party (6), Fine Gael (3) and Independent (1).

Former TDs re-elected
Eight former TDs were re-elected.

Leading vote-getters
The leading vote-getter in 2011 was Fine Gael leader Enda Kenny. The candidate who won the highest percentage of a quota was Fine Gael's Michael Noonan. The top ten by votes won were:

Reactions
Kenny said he would work on a quick formation of a new government, calling the verdict a "democratic revolution." He also said his top priority will be renegotiating the bailout. Despite his attempts to renegotiate the bailout, which was a condition in coalition talks, German Chancellor Angela Merkel response was read as a blow to these attempts when she said "We can't get to a point where Ireland pays lower interest rates than Portugal. [Ireland and Greece had] tapped an aid programme [and agreed to conditions that they must fulfil]. If the Irish government now has a problem with interest rates, our job is to figure out what we can do – or whether we can do anything." Pressure continued to mount on Kenny's attempt to reconfigure the loan terms of the bailout as Merkel was scheduled to attend a European People's Party leaders' meet that Kenny, Polish Prime Minister Donald Tusk and European Union President Herman Van Rompuy (of Belgium's CD&V) were also attending. Host Finnish Finance Minister Jyrki Katainen, facing an election of his own, also opposed lowering Ireland's average loan rate of 5.8%. In response to talking about indebted states cannot expect concessions having agreed to additional measures to boost competitiveness and stabilise their finances, he said: "You can't be rewarded by others for doing your job well. The concession is that those countries' credibility in the markets will improve."

The euro declined after the election on speculation the new government would seek to revalue the bailout with senior bank bond holders. The Irish Stock Exchange's ISEQ index increased by over 1% on 28 February following the election.

The Irish Independent blamed Bertie Ahern and his finance ministers Charlie McCreevy and Brian Cowen for having ignored warnings on public finances from civil servants during the Celtic Tiger days.

Analysis
The election result was read as harsh on the euro which Bloomberg read as its intention was to "provide economic harmony... [and] ensure political stability." Of which it said neither has happened. It also suggested that:

The Irish Times columnist Diarmaid Ferriter likened Fianna Fáil's electoral meltdown to the 1918 election, which saw the Irish Parliamentary Party nearly wiped off the map by Sinn Féin. According to Ferriter, in both cases the electorate rejected "a tired old movement, arrogant from long-time electoral dominance". He even suggested Fianna Fáil might have been swept out of the chamber entirely in a first-past-the-post system, and that the party now faced a battle to stay relevant on the Irish political scene.

Government formation
With the largest number of seats, but not a majority, Fine Gael was the most likely party to lead the new government. There had been speculation that the party might be able to form a single-party minority government supported by a number of independents or by Fianna Fáil. However, it became clear almost as soon as the result was beyond doubt that Fine Gael's senior leadership preferred to go into coalition with the Labour Party. Following a meeting of the leaders of the two parties, negotiating teams were appointed on 1 March to discuss the possibility of agreeing a joint programme for government. The teams were Michael Noonan, Phil Hogan and Alan Shatter for Fine Gael and Joan Burton, Brendan Howlin and Pat Rabbitte for Labour. After meeting for a second day they described the talks as "friendly". Officials from the Department of Finance and the National Treasury Management Agency also briefed them on economic issues as opposition parties had not been briefed before the election. Burton then said there was a "very challenging situation in the banking sector".

Late on the night of 5 March, Fine Gael and Labour reached a formal coalition agreement. The programme for government was ratified the following day by a special delegate conference of the Labour Party and by a meeting of the Fine Gael parliamentary party. This cleared the way for Enda Kenny to be nominated as Taoiseach on 9 March. The coalition deal was opposed within the Labour Party by Tommy Broughan and Joanna Tuffy.

When the Dáil convened on 9 March, Kenny was the only candidate nominated as Taoiseach, and was elected by 117 votes for to 27 against. as well as the Fine Gael and Labour parties, he was supported by a number of independent TDs, while Fianna Fáil abstained on the vote. Under the terms of the deal, Gilmore became Tánaiste and Minister for Foreign Affairs and Trade, and Labour have four other ministries.

See also
Government of the 31st Dáil
Members of the 24th Seanad
Members of the 31st Dáil

Notes, citations and sources

Notes

References

Further reading

External links

 Official election results handbook by the Irish Government
Retirements and Candidates for 31st Dáil (ElectionsIreland.org)
RTÉ News – Election 2011 (Archived)
The Irish Times – Election 2011
IrishPoliticians.com – Candidates by constituency, party and gender
NSD: European Election Database – Ireland publishes regional level election data; allows for comparisons of election results, 1992–2011

Manifestos
Fianna Fáil: Real Plan Better Future
Fine Gael: Let’s Get Ireland Working/ Cuirimis Éire Ag Obair
Green Party: Renewing Ireland
Labour Party: One Ireland - Jobs, Reform, Fairness 
Sinn Féin: There Is A Better Way/ Tá Bealach Níos Fearr Ann

 
General
2011 elections in the Republic of Ireland
2011
31st Dáil
February 2011 events in Europe